Bendigo West is an electoral district of the Legislative Assembly in the Australian state of Victoria. It is a  electorate centred on the city of Bendigo west of the Yungera railway line, and including surrounding rural towns to the west and south-west. It encompasses the localities of Bendigo City, California Gully, Castlemaine, Harcourt, Long Gully, Maldon, Marong, Newstead and West Bendigo. It also includes parts of the Bendigo suburbs of Eaglehawk, Golden Square and Kangaroo Flat. It lies within the Northern Victoria Region of the upper house, the Legislative Council.

Bendigo West has generally been a safe seat for the Labor parties throughout its history. It was created in 1904, when it was won by Labor candidate David Smith by 18 votes. Smith was re-elected several times, but was expelled from the party in 1911 over his support for introducing scripture lessons into state schools. He sat as an independent until the Labor Party split of 1917, when he joined Billy Hughes' rival National Labor Party, which subsequently became the Nationalist Party of Australia. Smith did not contest the 1924 election, and the seat returned to the Labor fold, being won by Arthur Cook. The seat was merged with Bendigo East in 1927, with Cook going on to serve as the member for Bendigo.

The electorate was recreated as a separate district in 1985, when it was won by former federal MP David Kennedy. Kennedy was defeated by Liberal Max Turner amidst the Liberal landslide win at the 1992 state election, but Turner lasted only one term before being defeated by Labor candidate Bob Cameron in 1996. Cameron was comfortably re-elected in 1999, 2002, and 2006, and left a margin of more than 10% for Maree Edwards to defend at the 2010 election. He served as Minister for Emergency Services in the Brumby government.

Members for Bendigo West

Election results

External links
 Electorate profile: Bendigo West District, Victorian Electoral Commission

References

Electoral districts of Victoria (Australia)
1904 establishments in Australia
1927 disestablishments in Australia
1985 establishments in Australia
Bendigo
Mount Alexander Shire